Paraliparis is a genus of fish in the family Liparidae, the snailfishes. It is found in benthic, benthopelagic and pelagic habitats in all the world's oceans.

Paraliparis species have one pair of nostrils and lack a pseudobranch or ventral suction disc.

The generic name means "resembling Liparis."

Species
There are currently 143 recognized species in this genus:

 Paraliparis abyssorum 
 Paraliparis acutidens 
 Paraliparis adustus 
 Paraliparis albeolus 
 Paraliparis albescens 
 Paraliparis alius 
 Paraliparis amerismos 
 Paraliparis andriashevi 
 Paraliparis antarcticus 
 Paraliparis anthracinus  (Coalskin snailfish)
 Paraliparis aspersus 
 Paraliparis ater  (Sooty snailfish)
 Paraliparis atramentatus 
 Paraliparis atrolabiatus  (Darklip snailfish)
 Paraliparis attenuatus 
 Paraliparis auriculatus  (Smallcheek snailfish)
 Paraliparis australiensis  (Australian snailfish)
 Paraliparis australis 
 Paraliparis avellaneus  (Nutty snailfish)
 Paraliparis badius  (Dark brown snailfish)
 Paraliparis balgueriasi 
 Paraliparis bathybius  (Black seasnail)
 Paraliparis bipolaris 
 Paraliparis brunneocaudatus  (Browntail snailfish)
 Paraliparis brunneus  (Brown snailfish)
 Paraliparis bullacephalus  (Bubble-head snailfish)
 Paraliparis calidus  (Lowfin snailfish)
 Paraliparis camilarus 
 Paraliparis caninus 
 Paraliparis carlbondi 
 Paraliparis cephalus  (Swellhead snailfish)
 Paraliparis cerasinus 
 Paraliparis challengeri 
 Paraliparis charcoti 
 Paraliparis copei 
 Paraliparis copei copei  (Blacksnout seasnail)
 Paraliparis copei gibbericeps 
 Paraliparis copei kerguelensis 
 Paraliparis copei wilsoni 
 Paraliparis coracinus 
 Paraliparis costatus  (Black ribbed snailfish)
 Paraliparis csiroi  (Loweye snailfish)
 Paraliparis dactyloides 
 Paraliparis dactylosus  (Red snailfish)
 Paraliparis darwini 
 Paraliparis deani  (Prickly snailfish)
 Paraliparis debueni 
 Paraliparis delphis  (Dolphin snailfish)
 Paraliparis devriesi 
 Paraliparis dewitti  (Brown ribbed snailfish)
 Paraliparis diploprora 
 Paraliparis dipterus 
 Paraliparis duhameli 
 Paraliparis eastmani  (Thickskin snailfish)
 Paraliparis edwardsi 
 Paraliparis ekaporus 
 Paraliparis eltanini 
 Paraliparis entochloris 
 Paraliparis epacrognathus 
 Paraliparis exilis 
 Paraliparis fimbriatus 
 Paraliparis freeborni 
 Paraliparis fuscolingua 
 Paraliparis galapagosensis 
 Paraliparis garmani  (Pouty seasnail)
 Paraliparis gomoni  (Squarechin snailfish)
 Paraliparis gracilis 
 Paraliparis grandis 
 Paraliparis haploporus 
 Paraliparis hawaiiensis 
 Paraliparis hobarti  (Palepore snailfish)
 Paraliparis holomelas 
 Paraliparis hubbsi 
 Paraliparis hureaui 
 Paraliparis hystrix 
 Paraliparis impariporus  (Unipore snailfish)
 Paraliparis incognita 
 Paraliparis infeliciter  (Badluck snailfish)
 Paraliparis kocki 
 Paraliparis kreffti 
 Paraliparis labiatus  (Biglip snailfish)
 Paraliparis lasti  (Rusty snailfish)
 Paraliparis latifrons  (Bigpored snailfish)
 Paraliparis leobergi 
 Paraliparis leucogaster 
 Paraliparis leucoglossus 
 Paraliparis liparinus 
 Paraliparis longicaecus 
 Paraliparis macrocephalus 
 Paraliparis macropterus 
 Paraliparis magnoculus 
 Paraliparis mandibularis 
 Paraliparis mawsoni 
 Paraliparis megalopus 
 Paraliparis meganchus  (Slit branchial paraliparis)
 Paraliparis melanobranchus 
 Paraliparis membranaceus 
 Paraliparis mentikoilon 
 Paraliparis mento 
 Paraliparis meridionalis 
 Paraliparis merodontus 
 Paraliparis mexicanus 
 Paraliparis molinai 
 Paraliparis monoporus 
 Paraliparis murieli 
 Paraliparis nassarum 
 Paraliparis neelovi 
 Paraliparis nigellus 
 Paraliparis nigrolineatus 
 Paraliparis nullansa 
 Paraliparis obliquosus 
 Paraliparis obtusirostris  (Bluntsnout snailfish)
 Paraliparis operculosus  (Longeared snailfish)
 Paraliparis orbitalis 
 Paraliparis orcadensis 
 Paraliparis parviradialis 
 Paraliparis paucidens  (Toothless snailfish)
 Paraliparis pearcyi 
 Paraliparis pectoralis 
 Paraliparis penicillus  (Comet snailfish)
 Paraliparis piceus  (Tarred snailfish)
 Paraliparis plagiostomus  (Sharkmouth snailfish)
 Paraliparis plicatus 
 Paraliparis porcus 
 Paraliparis posteroporus 
 Paraliparis pseudokreffti 
 Paraliparis retrodorsalis  (Shortfin snailfish)
 Paraliparis rosaceus  (Pink snailfish)
 Paraliparis rossi 
 Paraliparis rossi 
 Paraliparis selti (Blue Atacama snailfish)
 Paraliparis skeliphrus 
 Paraliparis ruficometes sp. nov. 
 Paraliparis stehmanni 
 Paraliparis tangaroa 
 Paraliparis tasmaniensis  (Tasmanian snailfish)
 Paraliparis terraenovae 
 Paraliparis tetrapteryx 
 Paraliparis thalassobathyalis 
 Paraliparis tompkinsae 
 Paraliparis trilobodon 
 Paraliparis trunovi 
 Paraliparis ulochir  (Broadfin snailfish)
 Paraliparis vaillanti 
 Paraliparis valentinae 
 Paraliparis violaceus 
 Paraliparis vipera 
 Paraliparis voroninorum 
 Paraliparis wolffi

References

Liparidae
Taxa named by Robert Collett